Malik Reaves (born December 15, 1995) is a professional gridiron football defensive back who is a free agent. He played college football for Villanova, where he earned all-CAA honors following his senior season.

High school career 
Reaves was a four-year letter winner in football and track at Duncan U. Fletcher High School where he was an all-state honoree, first-team All-Gateway Conference, and The Florida Times-Union All-First Coach Honorable Mention.

College career 
Reaves was fourth on the Wildcats defense in tackles in 2017 with 58 (35 solo).  He finished his career with 178 tackles in 43 games for Villanova, along with 4 interceptions, 13 pass defenses, and 2 forced fumbles.  Reaves earned second-team all-CAA honors twice, following his Sophomore (2015) and Senior (2017) seasons.

Professional career
Reaves was ranked among the top twenty-five at his position in the 2018 NFL Draft.

Kansas City Chiefs
Reaves signed with the Kansas City Chiefs as an undrafted free agent on May 8, 2018. He was waived on June 14, 2018.

Pittsburgh Steelers
On July 26, 2018, Reaves signed with the Pittsburgh Steelers. He was waived on September 1, 2019.

Canadian Football League
Reaves signed with the Winnipeg Blue Bombers on February 15, 2019. He was released before the start of the season on April 24, 2019. He signed with the Toronto Argonauts after the season on December 16, 2019, but was released on December 28, 2020.

References

External links 
 Villanova Wildcats bio

1995 births
Living people
Kansas City Chiefs players
Pittsburgh Steelers players
Players of American football from Jacksonville, Florida
Sportspeople from Jacksonville, Florida
Toronto Argonauts players
Villanova Wildcats football players
Winnipeg Blue Bombers players